"Twist of Fate" was the second and final single to be released from former Sugababe Siobhán Donaghy's debut studio album, Revolution in Me. The song failed to reach the heights of previous single "Overrated", which made number 52 in the UK Singles Chart. This was her final single to be released with London Records, due to her departure from the record label.

Track listing
 UK CD single #1
 "Twist of Fate" (Radio Edit) - 3:48
 "Don't Know Why" (Live) - 5:10
 "Twist of Fate" (Video) - 3:48

 UK CD single #2
 "Twist of Fate" (Album Version) - 4:50
 "I'm Glad You're Mine" (Live) - 3:12
 "Overrated" (Live at Glastonbury - Video) - 4:45

 Digital download and cassette
 "Twist of Fate" (Radio Edit) - 3:48
 "Don't Know Why" (Live) - 5:10

Charts

References

2003 singles
Siobhán Donaghy songs
Songs written by Cameron McVey
Songs written by Siobhán Donaghy
2003 songs
London Records singles
Songs written by Marlon Roudette
Song recordings produced by Cameron McVey